The 2002–03 Irish Cup was the 123rd edition of Northern Ireland's premier football knock-out cup competition. It concluded on 3 May 2003 with the final.

Linfield were the defending champions, winning their 36th Irish Cup last season after a 2–1 win over Portadown in the 2002 final. This season Linfield reached the quarter-finals, but went out to Omagh Town. Coleraine were the eventual winners, in what was their first appearance in the final in 17 years. The last time they had done so was in 1986, when they were defeated 2–1 by Glentoran. It was the same opposition but a different outcome this time. A 1–0 victory over the Glens, who were appearing in the final for the fifth time in eight years, was enough to seal Coleraine's first Irish Cup win in 26 years. The last time they had won the competition was in 1977.

Fifth round
Larne received a bye into the sixth round.

|}

Replays

|}

Sixth round

|}

Replay

|}

Quarter-finals

|}

Semi-finals

|}

Final

References

2002–03
2002–03 domestic association football cups
Cup